The Bajaj Wave is a motor scooter from Bajaj Auto. It is a revised Bajaj Saffire. The Wave offers a 109.7 cc DTS-i engine, CVT transmission and revised body panels. It has a maximum power of 8 bhp. It also offers Bajaj's ExhausTEC technology and a ride control switch. 

It competes against the Honda Activa and the TVS Scooty Pep.

References

External links
Bajaj Wave Website

Indian motor scooters
Wave